Pendleton is a small neighborhood in Cincinnati, Ohio, located on the east side of Over-the-Rhine, north of the Central Business District, and south of Mount Auburn. It is home of the Pendleton Art Center. The triangle-shaped boundaries of the neighborhood are Liberty Street, Reading Road/Central Parkway, and Sycamore Street.  The population was 1,088 as of the 2020 Census.

The neighborhood was named after George H. Pendleton (1825–1889), a U.S. Representative and Senator whose house still stands in the area.

Sometimes the neighborhood is referred to as the "Pendleton Art District" of Over-the-Rhine because of its small size, but Pendleton and Over-the-Rhine are officially two separate neighborhoods in District 1 of the City of Cincinnati. The Pendleton Art Center, the gem of this district, states that "With eight floors of studios featuring original pine floors, eight foot arched windows and over 200 artists, PAC is the world's largest collection of artists under one roof."  

Pendleton is considered a neighborhood in the Over-the-Rhine Historic District by the City of Cincinnati and the Over-the-Rhine Chamber of Commerce.

Demographics
The population was 1,088 as of the 2020 Census.

2000 data unavailable.

Gallery

References

Neighborhoods in Cincinnati